Futbol Club Barcelona Hoquei is a professional roller hockey team based in Barcelona, Spain. It is part of the FC Barcelona family and plays in the OK Liga. Due to the sponsoring the team is called FC Barcelona Lassa. 
It is the most successful roller hockey club in Spain and Europe with a record number of domestic, european and intercontinental titles.

History 

The roller hockey section was founded in 1942 but due to problems with its venue, it played only one season until 1948, beginning the great history of this section. In terms of trophies, Barcelona are the most successful team in Europe having won 22 European Cups.

Season to season

Trophies

Spain 
OK Liga: 32 (record)
1973–74, 1976–77, 1977–78, 1978–79, 1979–80, 1980–81, 1981–82, 1983–84, 1984–85, 1995–96, 1997–98, 1998–99, 1999–00, 2000–01, 2001–02, 2002–03, 2003–04,  2004–05, 2005–06, 2006–07, 2007–08, 2008–09, 2009–10, 2011–12, 2013–14, 2014–15, 2015–16, 2016–17, 2017–18, 2018–19, 2019–20, 2020–21
Copa del Rey: 25 (record)
1953, 1958, 1963, 1972, 1975, 1978, 1979, 1981, 1985, 1986, 1987, 1994, 2000, 2002, 2003, 2005, 2007, 2011, 2012, 2016, 2017, 2018, 2019, 2022, 2023
Spanish Super Cup: 12 (record)
2004, 2005, 2007, 2008, 2011, 2012, 2013, 2014, 2015, 2017, 2020, 2022

European 
Champions League: 22 (record)
1972–73, 1973–74, 1977–78, 1978–79, 1979–80, 1980–81, 1981–82, 1982–83, 1983–84, 1984–85, 1996–97, 1999–2000, 2000–01, 2001–02, 2003–04, 2004–05, 2006–07, 2007–08, 2009–10, 2013–14, 2014–15, 2017–18
CERH Cup Winner's Cup: 1
1986–87
WSE Cup: 1
2005–06
Continental Cup: 18 (record)
1980, 1981, 1982, 1983, 1984, 1985, 1997, 2000, 2001, 2002, 2004, 2005, 2006, 2007, 2008, 2010, 2015, 2018
CERH Ciudad de Vigo Tournament: 6
1996, 1997, 2000, 2001, 2004, 2007
Nations Cup: 1
1995
Iberian Cup: 3 (record)
1999–00, 2000–01, 2001–02

Intercontinental 
Intercontinental Cup: 5 (record)
 1998, 2005, 2008, 2014, 2018

Other 
Catalan League: 8 (record)
1994–95, 1995–96, 1996–97, 1997–98, 2018–19, 2019–20, 2020–21, 2021–22
Catalonia Championship: 2
1957, 1960

Famous Coaches 
 Carlos Figueroa
 Josep Lorente
 Joaquim Paüls

Famous players 
Ramón Benito
Joaquim Paüls
Gaby Cairo
José Luis Páez
Jordi Vila-Puig
Carles Trullols
Jordi Villacorta
Joan Torner
Josep Enric Torner

References

External links 
Official website

 
Catalan rink hockey clubs
Roller Hockey
1942 establishments in Spain

ar:نادي برشلونة لهوكي الجليد